The 2019 Bangkok Challenger II was a professional tennis tournament played on hard courts. It was part of the 2019 ATP Challenger Tour. It took place in Bangkok, Thailand between 18 and 24 February 2019.

Singles main-draw entrants

Seeds

 1 Rankings are as of 11 February 2019.

Other entrants
The following players received wildcards into the singles main draw:
  Thanapet Chanta
  Pruchya Isaro
  Palaphoom Kovapitukted
  Janko Tipsarević
  Wishaya Trongcharoenchaikul

The following players received entry into the singles main draw using their ITF World Tennis Ranking:
  Dimitar Kuzmanov
  David Pérez Sanz
  Oriol Roca Batalla
  Denis Yevseyev
 
The following players received entry from the qualifying draw:
  Bai Yan
  Ivan Gakhov

The following player received entry as a lucky loser:
  Moez Echargui

Champions

Singles

  James Duckworth def.  Alejandro Davidovich Fokina 6–4, 6–3.

Doubles

  Li Zhe /  Gonçalo Oliveira def.  Enrique López Pérez /  Hiroki Moriya 6–2, 6–1.

 
 ATP Challenger Tour
Tennis, ATP Challenger Tour, Bangkok Challenger II
Tennis, ATP Challenger Tour, Bangkok Challenger II

Tennis, ATP Challenger Tour, Bangkok Challenger II